Chhura is a nagar panchayat located in the Gariaband district (earlier in Raipur district) of Chhattisgarh state of India.

Omkar Shah, member of Chhattisgarh Vidhan Sabha belongs to this village.

References

Villages in Gariaband district